The 1966 South African Grand Prix, formally titled the 12th International RAC Grand Prix of South Africa (Afrikaans: 12de Internasionale RAC Grand Prix van Suid-Afrika), was a non-championship Formula One motor race held on 1 January 1966 at Prince George Circuit, East London, South Africa. The race, run over 60 laps of the circuit, was won by British driver Mike Spence in a works Lotus-Climax. Spence won by two laps from the private Brabham-BRM of Swiss driver Jo Siffert, with fellow Briton Peter Arundell third in the other works Lotus-Climax.

Results

References

 Race results at Silhouet.com

South African Grand Prix
Grand Prix
South African Grand Prix
January 1966 sports events in Africa